The bombing of the British Embassy at Porta Pia in Rome was a terrorist action perpetrated by the Irgun that occurred on 31 October 1946. Two timed explosives encased in suitcases were planted by the Embassy's front entrance; the resulting blast injured two people and damaged the building's residential section beyond repair. The Irgun targeted the Embassy because they considered it an obstacle to illegal Jewish immigration into Mandatory Palestine. One of the Irgun's intended targets, ambassador Noel Charles, was away on leave during the attack. It was quickly determined that foreign militants from Mandatory Palestine were behind the attack and under pressure from Great Britain, the Italian police, Carabinieri and the Allied Police Force rounded up numerous members of the Betar organization, which had recruited militants from among the displaced refugees. Confirming fears of the expansion of Jewish terrorism beyond Mandatory Palestine, the bombing of the Embassy was the first attack against British personnel by the Irgun on European soil.

The British and Italian governments commenced an extensive investigation and concluded that Irgun operatives from Mandatory Palestine organized the attack. The attack was condemned by the leaders of Jewish agencies superintending their refugees. Italy subsequently enacted strict immigration reform and antisemitic sentiment heightened in the United Kingdom. During the early 1950s, Israel lobbied the British to pressure the Italian government not to pursue the militants. In 1952, eight suspects–including ringleader Moishe Deitel–were tried in absentia and received light sentences ranging from 8 to 16 months.

Background 
The British government anticipated the threat of Jewish terrorism emanating outside Mandatory Palestine in the aftermath of the Second World War. The Irgun had been founded before the Holocaust out of discontent with the Haganah's policy of havlagah, or self-restraint. It became the armed wing of Revisionist Zionism in 1936, a turn related to the Arab recourse to insurrectionary violence in that year, itself a protest against British policy regarding Jewish immigration. Terrorism, the Irgun reasoned, was a winning tactic for it had enabled the Arabs to alter Great Britain's policy on Jewish migration into Palestine. The consequent White Paper of 1939 severely curtailed further Jewish immigration by imposing quotas and ignited a brief military response by the Irgun as well as its later offshoot Lehi, with both concluding that only campaigns of political violence targeting British personnel and installations could shift the British. The Irgun suspended these operations when the Second World War broke out some months later. News from occupied Europe of the Holocaust led them to undertake an insurrection in 1944 under the leadership of Menachem Begin. The Irgun also played a key role in organizing Aliyah Bet to enable clandestine Jewish immigration into Palestine, and is said to have singled out the Embassy convinced that it was a center of "anti Jewish intrigue" curbing illegal Jewish immigration to Palestine.

Before he retired as MI5's wartime Director General in May 1946, David Petrie offered an assessment of the threat of Jewish terrorism in Europe and a warning: "the red light is definitely showing". The alert was confirmed by his successor Sir Percy Sillitoe in August and September, when he designated the Irgun and Lehi as the possibly planning to assassinate prominent English figures outside the Middle East. MI5 considered Mandatory Palestine a priority within the British Empire and had Defence Security Officers (DSO) stationed within the Mandate, working with local criminal investigation departments (CID) as well as MI5's sister agency the Secret Intelligence Service (SIS), to collect intel on Jewish terrorist threats to Britain. Their sources warned that the Irgun and Lehi were targeting British personnel outside Mandatory Palestine. MI5 were obliged to take these threats seriously: on 22 July 1946, the Irgun bombed the King David Hotel, housing British government offices, in Jerusalem, killing 91. A low intensity guerilla war was being waged in Palestine, with sabotage of communication lines and attacks on British soldiers and mandatory policemen, 99 being killed for the period 1 October through to 18 November. While the Haganah decided at this time to suspend its role in sabotage operations, the Irgun and the Lehi extended their operations to Europe to strike at British diplomatic representatives.

Bombing 

By November 1945 alone, it was calculated that some 15,000 Jewish refugees had managed to enter Italy over the preceding six months since the termination of hostilities; the country's geographical location was favorable for the traffic of refugees to Palestine. In September 1945, already engaged for several years in an insurgency against the British Mandatory authorities and army in Palestine, the Irgun high command dispatched a mission to Europe whose aim was to organize the flow of displaced Jewish survivors of the Holocaust to Palestine, recruit soldiers, engage in sabotage against Great Britain and coordinate activities among Zionist organizations sympathetic to the cause.

Eli Tavin, nicknamed Pesach, was appointed head of operations in the diaspora and set up the first logistical base for the group in Italy. Tavin found strong support there among Italian antifascist resistance groups, and, recruiting many members of the Betar organization among the refugees, many of the latter of whom, residing in camps run by UNRRA were also eager to participate, set up cells through the country, while establishing two schools to train commandos for operations at Tricase and Ladispoli. Already in March 1946, several refugees, Dov Gurwitz(Roumenian), Aba Churman (Polish), assisted by several others – Natan Rzepkowicz (Polish), Tiburzio Deitel (Fiume), Chono Steingarten (Polish) and Girsh Guta (Polish), had established an office of Jewish correspondence in via Sicilia 135, near the Allied Intelligenced offices, and this was chosen to become the central office for Irgun operations in Italy.  The British Embassy in Italy was considered by the Irgun to be a centre of operations hindering Jewish migration to Palestine, and thus was singled out as a target.  Planning for the operation was completed by early October. Before the war Zeev Jabotinsky's Betar movement had obtained permission from Mussolini to have militants train at a Naval College established in Civitavecchia under the auspices of the Italian fascist authorities. According to the historian of fascism Giuseppe Parlato, the Irgun had purchased from the post-war neofascist terrorist group FAR the explosives used for the attempt via the offices of its co-founder Pino Romualdi a fascist who had set up a secret repository of army munitions and explosives after war's end. Furio Biagini states that the material was taken from deposits located in a center administered by UNRRA.

On the night of 31 October 1946, Irgun operatives divided into two squads: one daubed a large swastika on the front wall of the British Consulate, and the other planted two explosives, amounting to 40 kilos of TNT encased in suitcases and rigged to a timer on the steps of the Embassy's front entrance in Via XX Settembre. A driver, working for the embassy, noticed the suitcases and entered the rear of the building to report them. A few moments later, at 02:43, the explosives detonated. The report of the explosion echoed throughout the entire city and was sufficiently powerful to shatter all the windows of the houses and apartments within a distance of one kilometer. The 350-children school of the Handmaids of the Sacred Heart was "badly damaged." The Embassy's residential section was destroyed by the blast which created a gaping hole in the entranceway. Noel Charles–the British ambassador and main target of the attack–was away on leave though his quarters were heavily damaged. No British personnel were harmed but two Italians, one a soldier who happened to be passing by and the other the Embassy's concierge, suffered severe wounds that left them in a critical condition.

Aftermath 
The bombing was the first terrorist operation by the Irgun against British personnel in Europe; it resulted in both a setback for illegal Jewish immigration to Palestine, and a major public relations disaster for the Zionist mainstream.

The chief of the Italian police declared the following day that no Italian nationals were involved, that the incident bore the hallmarks of similar operations against the British in Palestine, and that those responsible were Jews from Palestine, dismissing rumours alleging that Italian fascists might have been responsible.  An investigation was conducted by the Polizia di Stato with British and American assistance. On the 4 November the Irgun plastered streets in many Italian cities with notices proclaiming it was behind the explosion and released to an American journalist a communiqué claiming responsibility and this was duly reported in The Times on 6 November. The Irgun also threatened more coordinated attacks against Britain, and justified its actions by charging that Great Britain was engaged in a "war of extermination" against Jews throughout the world. Soon three refugees were quickly arrested on suspicion, and another two detained on 4 November.  The Irgun Zvai Leumi sabotage school was discovered in Rome, where pistols, ammunition, hand grenades, and training literature were found. Four other suspects were caught in Genova, and Tavin arrested in December. Among those arrested were Dow Gurwitz, Tiburzio Deitel, Michael Braun and David Viten.

Many were members of Betar. The English authorities requested that those rounded up be handed over, for transfer to British prison camps in Eritrea. One of the arrested, Israel (Zeev) Epstein, a childhood friend of the Irgun leader Menachem Begin, attempted to flee from his imprisonment on 27 December 1946.  He had been receiving assistance from the American League for a Free Palestine, which provided blankets, food and cash, but which denied sending him the rope with which he escaped. He was shot in the stomach after an Italian officer on the scene fired a warning shot and called on him to stop. He died of his wounds later that day. Eventually after reported pressure from the Allied Command, the suspects were released.

The distinguished Italian criminal lawyer Giovanni Persico, who was a friend of Jabotinsky's from their days at university, took on the suspects' defense. In November, the British media began to sensationalize the idea that Jewish terrorism was a threat to Britain itself, creating unsubstantiated accounts of other putative terrorist plots and activities. However, the American League for Free Palestine on behalf of Irgun and Irgun itself made the same threats as what the media was reporting. As a consequence, antisemitic sentiments increased in the United Kingdom. Though the Jewish leadership of displacement camps condemned the bombing, the attack had an adverse effect on refugees in Italy. Encouraged by Britain, the Italian government enacted several pieces of legislation, reforming their immigration policy. The government set a registry deadline for 31 March 1947 and imposed strict travel visa requirements. The Irgun bases of operations in Italy were closed down and shifted to other European capitals where operatives continued to strike at British targets: the Sacher Hotel in Vienna, which at the time was headquarters of the British Army in that area, to name just one. In order not to be outdone by the Irgun, the rival Lehi undertook similar operations against the Colonial Office in London, which the Scotland Yard unit investigating Jewish terrorist activities linked to the Embassy bombing, and only desisted from a plan to release a strain of cholera bacteria into London's underground water supply system by news that the British government had decided to leave Palestine. According to Italian historian Furio Biagini the entire world cheered at the way such bold feats by members of the Palestinian yishuv managed to humiliate Great Britain and the recourse to terrorism by the Irgun and Lehi were complementary to the activities of the Haganah and the diplomacy of the Jewish Agency in effecting the British withdrawal from Palestine.

Five years following the bombing, Israel urged Britain to pressure Italy not to pursue eight suspected perpetrators of the bombing who resided in Israel. Five of them had been arrested in Rome but had jumped bail and escaped, while three others had never been arrested. On 17 April 1952, the Italian government tried Moshe Deitel in absentia for his leading part in the bombing. Deitel was found guilty and sentenced to 16 months imprisonment. The seven other suspects were also convicted for taking part in the bombing and received eight-month sentences. The sentences, however, were immediately annulled by amnesties.

See also
 List of Irgun operations

Notes

Citations

Sources

External links
 Newsreel at the time of the bombing

1946 in Italy
Attacks on diplomatic missions in Italy
Attacks on diplomatic missions of the United Kingdom
British Embassy
Irgun
Terrorist incidents in 1946
Zionist terrorism